The 2003–04 season was Real Madrid CF's 73rd season in La Liga. This article lists all matches that the club played in the 2003–04 season, and also shows statistics of the club's players. The club played the season wearing their classic white home and teal blue away kits.

Season summary
In spite of the arduous pre-season, the team got off to a good start. They won the Supercopa de España against Mallorca with a 3–0 victory on 27 August in the second leg, avenging their loss to the same side in the 2002–03 Copa del Rey. By the time half of the season had passed, Madrid topped the league table and was still in contention for the Copa del Rey and Champions League trophies. However, the team was eliminated in the quarter-finals of the Champions League on away goals by Monaco and finished as runners-up in the domestic cup, losing to Zaragoza after extra time. They also lost their final five La Liga matches and finished in fourth place, which gave Valencia the title. It was the last time that Real Madrid finished below second place until the 2013–14 season, which brought a long-awaited La Décima.

Transfers

In

Total spending:  €35,000,000

Out

Total income:  €16,000,000

Squad

Left club during season

 (transferred to Chelsea in August 2003)

Pre-season
The team embarked on a summer tour in Asia, for 18 days, to cash in on the worldwide appeal of their new signing, David Beckham. It included exhibition matches in Beijing, Tokyo, Hong Kong and Bangkok, which alone earned the club €10 million. This was compared by popular contrary with the tour with the first visit of The Beatles to the United States in 1964. Although lucrative and generating wide publicity, the preparation value of the Asia was questionable, considering that the long 2003–04 season which lay ahead. It was exhausting for the players, due to endless rounds of publicity engagements and restrictions on the players' freedom of movement (due to the team hotel being besieged by fans). Most players admitted that they would have preferred a low-profile training camp and/or to have been home in Spain for the pre-season, instead of playing meaningless show matches against low quality opponents. The Asia tour has been said to have catered more to the needs of the club's marketing than to its players' preparations.

Pre-season

Results

2003 Supercopa de España

La Liga

Classification

Results by round

Matches

Copa del Rey

Round of 64

Round of 32

Round of 16

Quarter-finals

Semi-finals

Final

UEFA Champions League

Group stage

Knockout phase

Round of 16

Quarter-finals

Statistics

Players statistics

References

Spanish football clubs 2003–04 season
Real Madrid CF seasons